Joel Astman (born February 12, 1975), known professionally as J.Period, is a Brooklyn-based Mixtape DJ, remixer and hip-hop producer. He is best known for producing official mixtape collaborations with Q-Tip, John Legend, Nas, Big Daddy Kane, Rakim, Lauryn Hill, the Roots, the Isley Brothers and Mary J. Blige, and an "audio-biography" style that incorporates personal interviews with these artists into his “Best of” compilations.
His original production and remixes have also recently appeared in film trailers for Universal Pictures' American Gangster (2007)
and Fox Searchlight's Street Kings (2008).
In November 2008, J.Period became the first DJ/producer commissioned by Activision to score and produce an entire video game soundtrack, Tony Hawk's Motion for Nintendo DS.

Awards and accolades 
2003 – Elemental Magazine, Awarded Mixtape DJ Rookie of the Year
2003 – i-jonez.com, Awarded Mixtape of the Year (J.Period, Best of Big Daddy Kane)
2004 – Toyota/ Scion “Free Up Your Mix” DJ Competition, Awarded New York Champion
2005 – Source Magazine, Awarded Mixtape DJ of the Year
2005 – MTV, Awarded Top 10 Mixtapes of 2005 (J.Period Best of Lauryn Hill)
2006 – MTV, Awarded Top DJs of 2006
2006 – Power Summit, Awarded Mixtape DJ of the Year
2006 – Allhiphop.com, Awarded Best Mixtapes of 2006 (J.Period, Best of The Roots)
2006 – About.com, Awarded Best Mixtapes of 2006: Runner-Up (J.Period, Best of The Roots)
2007 – MTV, Awarded Top 5 DJs of 2007
2007 – New York Magazine, Awarded Top 10 Mixtapes of 2007 (J.Period & G. Brown, March 9)
2008 – MTV, Awarded Top Street Albums (J.Period & G Brown, March 9: B.I.G. Tribute")
2009 – Beyond Race Magazine, Awarded Top Albums of 2009 (J.Period & Nneka, "The Madness (Onye-Ala)")

 Discography 

Video games
2008 – Tony Hawk's Motion for Nintendo DS (Produced soundtrack for premiere gaming franchise)
2009 – Dj Hero for Xbox 360, PS3 and Nintendo Wii (produced a number of playable mixes for the game)

Film and television
1999 – Strictly Rockers (Appeared on Showtime’s ShoNext network)
2007 – 25th Hour (Remix) – (Appeared in TV Spots for Universal Pictures’ American Gangster)
2008 – J.Period & Game Rebellion: Break Down (Appears in Trailers for Fox Searchlight’s Street Kings)

Albums
2002 – Zion I: Deep Water Slang (J.Period performs scratches)
2005 – Zion I: True & Livin (J.Period performs scratches)

Singles
2003 – Zion I f. J.Period: The Drill/ Flow (12”) - J.Period performs scratches
2005 – J.Period & Lauryn Hill: Best of Lauryn Hill Remixes (12”) (Vinyl Only)
2005 – Fugees: Take It Easy (12”) (J.Period performs scratches)
2006 – J.Period & C.L. Smooth: Man On Fire Freestyles (Vinyl Only)
2006 – J.Period & Black Thought – Roots Exclusives & Freestyles (Vinyl Only)
2007 – J.Period & G. Brown: March 9 B.I.G. Remixes (Vinyl Only)
2008 – J.Period: Q-Tip For President (Exclusive Freestyle) (Single)(Free Download)
2008 – J.Period: Primo Tribute Intro (Single)(Free Download)
2009 – J.Period: Excursions 2009 (Tribute Remix) (Single)(Free Download)
2009 – J.Period: Buggin' Out 2009(Tribute Remix) (Single)(Free Download)
2009 – J.Period & Black Thought – Brooklyn Go Hard (Live at Brooklyn Hip Hop Festival 2009(Single)(Free Download)
2009 – J.Period & Talib Kweli – Ambitionz (Exclusive Freestyle)(Single)(Free Download)
2009 – J.Period & Talib Kweli – Youthful (Exclusive Freestyle)(Single)(Free Download)
2009 – J.Period & Talib Kweli – Country Couzins Feat. Bun B (J.Period Remix)(Single)(Free Download)
2009 – J.Period & Nneka – Changes (J.Period Remix) Feat. M-1 & General Steele(Single)(Free Download)
2009 – J.Period & Nneka – Walking (J.Period Remix) Feat. Jay Electronica(Single)(Free Download)

Mixtapes
2000 – Beats from New York2000 – Elements of Hip Hop Culture2001 – Warr Uv Da Worldz: Drum’n’Bass vs. Hip Hop2001 – Sound Clash Vol. 1: Reggae2001 – Love Jones Vol. 12001 – Live at DJ Honda’s h272 Vol. 12002 – Live at DJ Honda’s h272 Vol. 22002 – Introducing J.Period: 2CD2002 – Truelements Radio2002 – Dark Dayz2003 – Love Jones Vol. 2 Classic Soul2003 – Love Jones Vol. 3 Love No Limit2003 – Ecko Love Unlimited 22003 – J.Period & Big Daddy Kane: Best of Big Daddy Kane (Hosted by BDK)<
2004 – Sound Clash Vol. 2: Reggae2004 – In The Trunk: Heavy Bass2004 – J.Period & Nas: Best of Nas (Hosted by Nas)
2004 – Ecko Unlimitd Holiday Hook-Up (Promo Only)
2005 – J.Period & Lauryn Hill: Best of Lauryn Hill: Fire & Water2006 – Class of 06: G.O.O.D. Music2006 – Official Best of Isley Brothers(Remixed)
2006 – C.L. Smooth: Man On Fire Freestyle Sessions2006 – J.Period & The Roots: Official Best of The Roots2007 – J.Period & G. Brown: March 9 B.I.G. Tribute2007 – J.Period, JS-1 & DV-One: Rock Steady Crew 30th Anniversary Tribute2007 – J.Period & Game Rebellion: Searching for Rick Rubin2007 – J.Period & DJ KL: The Blast (Promo Only)
2007 – Tanqueray T&T Style Sessions Promo Mix, Mixed by J.Period
2008 – Toyota Camry Magazine Promo Mix, Mixed by J.Period
2008 – J.Period & G. Brown: March 9 Vol.2 Collector's Edition2008 – J.Period, Don Cannon &Skillz : Design Of A Decade Vol.12009 – J.Period & Q-Tip: The [Abstract] Best Vol. 12009 – J.Period & K'naan The Messengers2009 – Man or The Music: A Tribute To Michael Jackson2009 – J.Period & Nneka The Madness (Onye-Ala)2011 – J.Period, The Roots & John Legend Wake Up! Radio2012 – J.Period & Zion I Bomb First2013 - #RAGEISBACK''
2016 - The Hamilton Mixtape
2019 - The RISE UP Project
2019 - J.Period Presents The Live Mixtape [The Healing Edition] feat. Maimouna Youssef aka Mumu Fresh
2021 - J.Period Presents... The Live Mixtape: Story To Tell Edition

References

External links
J.Period Official Website
J.Period Official MySpace Page
J.Period Facebook
J.Period Bio on Billboard

Living people
1975 births
American DJs